Gregory Daren Adams (born August 15, 1963) is a Canadian former ice hockey winger who played in the National Hockey League (NHL) from 1984 to 2001.

Playing career 
Before turning pro, Adams played two seasons ('82–83 and '83–84) at Northern Arizona University. He led the nation in scoring his sophomore season. Undrafted, he was then signed by the New Jersey Devils on June 24, 1984. He played three seasons with the Devils until he was traded to the Vancouver Canucks on September 15, 1987 along with Kirk McLean for Patrik Sundstrom and a fourth round pick in the 1988 NHL Entry Draft (Matt Ruchty). The following season, when Greg C. Adams was traded to Vancouver, the younger Greg Adams became identified by the nickname Greg "Gus" Adams.  

Adams would go on to play eight seasons in Vancouver. During the 1994 Stanley Cup Playoffs, Adams scored a goal in what many Canucks fans believe to be one of the greatest moments in team history. In Game 5 of the Western Conference Finals against the Toronto Maple Leafs, Adams scored the game-winning goal in overtime, catapulting the team to their second-ever Stanley Cup Final berth. He would also score the overtime winner in Game 1 of that Stanley Cup finals against the New York Rangers.

Adams was traded to the Dallas Stars in the 1994–95 season. After four seasons in Dallas, he moved on to play for the Phoenix Coyotes for two seasons (1998–99 and 1999–2000). After Phoenix, Adams played one season (2000–01) with the Florida Panthers and then retired from the NHL.

Adams was a decent goal scorer who managed to score more than 30 goals four times in his career and had nine seasons with more than 20. Twice he scored over 70 points, once with the Devils (77) and once with the Canucks (76). Unfortunately, Adams was often plagued with the injury bug and only once managed to play one full season.

Career statistics

Regular season and playoffs

International

See also
List of NHL players with 1,000 games played

References

External links 

1963 births
Living people
Canadian ice hockey left wingers
Dallas Stars players
Florida Panthers players
Frankfurt Lions players
Ice hockey people from British Columbia
Kelowna Buckaroos players
Maine Mariners players
National Hockey League All-Stars
New Jersey Devils players
Northern Arizona Lumberjacks men's ice hockey players
People from Nelson, British Columbia
Phoenix Coyotes players
Tampa Bay Lightning scouts
Undrafted National Hockey League players
Vancouver Canucks players
Canadian expatriate ice hockey players in Germany